is a Japanese former cyclist. He competed in the team pursuit event at the 1984 Summer Olympics.

References

External links
 

1960 births
Living people
Japanese male cyclists
Olympic cyclists of Japan
Cyclists at the 1984 Summer Olympics
Sportspeople from Hiroshima